The Avery Coonley School (ACS), commonly called Avery Coonley, is an independent, coeducational day school serving academically gifted students in preschool through eighth grade (approximately ages 3 to 14), and is located in Downers Grove, DuPage County, Illinois. The school was founded in 1906 to promote the progressive educational theories developed by John Dewey and other turn-of-the-20th-century philosophers, and was a nationally recognized model for progressive education well into the 1940s. From 1943 to 1965, Avery Coonley was part of the National College of Education (now National Louis University), serving as a living laboratory for teacher training and educational research. In the 1960s, ACS became a regional research center and a leadership hub for independent schools, and began to focus on the education of the gifted.

The school has occupied several structures in its history, including a small cottage on the Coonley Estate in Riverside, Illinois, and another building designed by Frank Lloyd Wright. It moved to Downers Grove in 1916 and became the Avery Coonley School in 1929, with a new  campus designed in the Prairie and Arts and Crafts styles, landscaped by Jens Jensen, who was known as "dean of the world's landscape architects". The campus has been expanded several times since the 1980s to create more space for arts, technology, and classrooms. Avery Coonley was added to the National Register of Historic Places in 2007, citing the "long-lasting influence on schools throughout the country" of the educational program and the design of the building and grounds.

The progressive legacy is still evident in the modern curriculum, which retains many traditions and educational activities dating back to the beginning of the school. Students work a minimum of one year above their current grade level, and explore broad themes allowing them to learn across subjects and engage in creative and collaborative projects, using instructional technology extensively. Opportunities to build on classroom studies are offered through a range of extracurricular activities. Admission is competitive and an IQ score of at least 124 is required. ACS is notable for its record of success in academic competitions at the state and national levels in mathematics, science, geography, and other subjects. ACS was recognized as a Blue Ribbon School by the United States Department of Education in 1988. Avery Coonley attracted national media attention in 1994 when the school was banned from competition in the Illinois State Science Fair after winning for the fourth year in a row. Although the decision was later reversed, the controversy was decried by the press as an example of the "dumbing down" of education and the victory of self-esteem over excellence in schools.

History

Founding and Cottage School (1906–1916) 

In 1906, Queene Ferry Coonley, wife of wealthy Riverside industrialist and publisher Avery Coonley, decided to start a kindergarten program to allow children younger than five years old to attend. Queene Coonley was trained as a social worker and kindergarten teacher at the Detroit Normal School (now Wayne State University) and was impressed by the theories of Friedrich Fröbel, who believed children's early education should be an extension of their lives at home. Fröbel's theories captured the three main principles of what John Dewey would later call the "kindergarten attitude", which applied not just to kindergartners but to children of all ages. Dewey wrote that the primary role of the school is to train children in cooperative living, the root of all learning is the activity of the child and not external material, and directing children's spontaneous impulses towards maintaining the collective life of the school is how they become prepared for adult life. Convinced of these principles, Coonley sought to enroll her four-year-old daughter in the Riverside School, one of the few public kindergartens in the area, but was disappointed when the child was not eligible because she had not yet turned five.

Coonley persuaded the director of the Riverside program, Lucia Burton Morse, and her assistant, Charlotte Krum, to help launch a new school. Morse and Krum had attended Elizabeth Harrison's Kindergarten College, which "championed the concept of kindergarten teaching in America and was one of the first teacher's colleges in the country to offer a four-year program culminating in the bachelor of education degree". There they had studied the educational theories of John Dewey and others, who stood opposed to the more traditional pedagogical practices of the day, which saw education as the business of transmitting long-standing bodies of information to new generations and inculcating moral training based on rules and standards of conduct. Their new progressive views of education emphasized an individualized approach to education and an integrated curriculum where children learned from experience and social interaction. According to Dewey, "it is a cardinal precept of the newer school of education that the beginning of instruction shall be made with the experience learners already have; that this experience and the capacities that have been developed during its course provide the starting point for all further learning." These ideas laid the foundations of what would become the "progressive movement" in education. Coonley, Morse, and Krum brought these ideas with them to the new school, which Coonley described as "a Children's Community. Its purpose was not so much to teach what others had thought or grown-ups had done, but for the children themselves to do something."

A small cottage on the Coonley estate served as the first school building, reflected by its original name, the Cottage School.  The designer was Charles Whittlesey, who had apprenticed under Louis Sullivan.  The estate's main building, the Avery Coonley House, designed by Frank Lloyd Wright, is now a National Historic Landmark. Over the years, many of the estate's buildings would be pressed into use as classrooms and residences for teachers. As new grades were added the school grew, and in 1911 Coonley commissioned Wright to design a larger space for the students. The new building was completed in 1912 and became known as the Coonley Playhouse, and featured dozens of brightly colored art glass windows, evoking flags, balloons, and confetti in what Wright referred to as a "kinder-symphony". "Their bright primary colors and lively geometric designs make them some of Wright's most famous windows."

Two years of kindergarten were offered, beginning at age four, and students progressed through to first grade with other students their age. The Cottage School was free to all students, and was supported both by Coonley's own resources and funds raised by the Kindergarten Education Association. The Association, of which Coonley was president, promoted new educational ideas and raised money to help support them. In 1915, John Dewey and his daughter Evelyn featured the Cottage School in their book, The Schools of To-Morrow, which examined how progressive schools around the country put new educational ideas into action. They were especially struck by how prominently nature featured in school life, noting that: 
[T]hey have, for example, a rare bird that is as much a personality in school life as any of the children, and the children, having cared for him and watched his growth and habits, have become much more interested in wild birds. In the backyard is a goat, the best liked thing on the place, where the children have raised him from a little kid; and they still do all the work of caring for him. The Deweys held the Cottage School as an example of training in good citizenship, commenting on its mock elections, self-government, and public service: "The school organized by the pupils into a civic league has made itself responsible for the conditions of the streets in certain portions of town, and is not only cleaning up but trying to get the rest of the town interested in the problem." The teaching of English was also noted, as it was not taught as a separate subject but as part of history lessons, journal-keeping, and other exercises. Dewey wrote, "The emphasis is put on helping the child to express his ideas; but such work provides ample opportunity for the required drill in the mechanics of writing."

Junior Elementary School (1916–1929) 

At the same time the Playhouse was built, Coonley agreed to build a kindergarten in the nearby town of Downers Grove, which did not have a public school. Coonley purchased land on Grove Street and commissioned the architectural firm of Perkins, Fellows & Hamilton to design the building. The school, led by Lucia Morse, was launched as the Kindergarten Extension Association School in 1912. In 1916, the Cottage School was closed and a first grade program was launched at the Downers Grove kindergarten, which was renamed the Junior Elementary School. To accommodate older students, a second grade class was added in 1920 for students around seven years old, a third grade in 1926 for eight-year-olds, and a fourth grade for nine-year-old students shortly thereafter.

The Coonleys moved to Washington, D.C. in 1916, and while Queene continued to devote her time and money, she left the day-to-day direction of the school to Morse. Under her direction, the Junior Elementary School built upon the educational foundations established at the Cottage School, with its focus on the active participation of the students. Drama, music, and dance were important parts of the curriculum, and nature study remained an integral component of students' activities. These ideas, and nature study in particular, were largely the creation of Colonel Francis Wayland Parker, whom John Dewey once referred to as "the father of progressive education". The Junior Elementary School was a proving ground for these principles, which called for a new way of relating to students, allowing them to freely experience their lessons on their own terms. No distinction was made between boys' and girls' activities, which included gardening, carpentry, and cooking. Coonley recalled that "[w]e had boys and girls. We made no distinction, boys and girls cooked, boys and girls did carpenter work, boys and girls took an equal part in all matters of government." Students re-enacted history and literature, composed their own music, and spent much of their time outdoors. In 1924, Coonley and Morse helped found a journal entitled Progressive Education, in which they published their own practical experiences at the school, accompanied by articles written by leading educational theorists, including John Dewey. It became the leading professional journal of the progressive education movement and was published until 1957.

Avery Coonley School (1929–1960s) 

Enrollment continued to grow, and a second building was added to the Junior Elementary School campus in the late 1920s, but still larger facilities were deemed necessary to accommodate future growth and additional grade levels. Coonley chose a wooded tract in Downers Grove, adjacent to the Maple Grove Forest Preserve, as the site for the new building, and her son-in-law, Waldron Faulkner, became the architect of the new building project. Over one hundred students attended school in the opened building on September 30, 1929, and it was renamed The Avery Coonley School, in honor of Coonley's late husband, who had died in 1920. Coonley chose an unusual mascot to represent the ideals of the school. She felt a seahorse was an example of a unique creature who was also a member of a larger community—an analogy for her vision for Avery Coonley. The seahorse swims upright, from which derives the school motto: "Onward and Upward", and representations of seahorses are reflected in decorative ironwork and the weather vane on the 1929 building.

Progressive education, a pedagogy promoting learning through real-life experiences, was at its zenith in the United States in the 1920s and 30s, and the Avery Coonley School was a widely known model of these theories in action. Avery Coonley was featured regularly in Progressive Education and other professional journals, and in 1938, the editor of Progressive Education, Gertrude Hartman, published a profile of the Avery Coonley School in her book Finding Wisdom: Chronicles of a School of Today. She noted, "[v]isitors from all parts of the United States and from foreign countries [came] to see the school—sometimes as many as thirty in a day." Hartman described in great detail the curriculum and daily life of the school, which had by then added a seventh and eighth grade, commenting that the most noticeable thing about it is the spirit of earnestness and joy which pervades it ... There is a fundamental philosophy of life and education underlying the work of the school, which gives clear direction to all its activities. Broad areas are planned, which form the framework of the curriculum. These however are flexible and subject to modification depending upon conditions. The book described the progress of the students from their first year of kindergarten through their ten years of study, capturing in photos, stories, and examples of students' work their encounters with nature, history, art and other subjects through creative play and collaborative projects. She concluded with observations about the importance of the daily life of the school in developing social responsibility: It is the belief of those concerned with the school that out of the kind of education described here will emerge more socially enlightened members of society than the education of our generation has produced ... The method in which those in the school place their faith is the building into the very nature of growing boys and girls, through their growing years, those qualities of mind and spirit from which alone a new attitude towards human relations can evolve. Finding Wisdom became a classic in the education field and solidified the Avery Coonley School's national reputation as a model of progressive education.

Morse died in 1940, after 34 years as director, and several years went by without a strong local leadership. To ensure a sounder footing for the future, Coonley merged Avery Coonley with the National College of Education (NCE, formerly the Chicago Kindergarten College and now National Louis University) in Evanston, Illinois, in 1943. The two institutions had close ties dating back to Morse's Kindergarten College days, and the arrangement took advantage of the NCE's financial and teaching resources while Avery Coonley provided a living laboratory for teacher training and educational research. Under NCE management, ACS continued to offer a curriculum that emphasized practical learning, outdoor education—including farming—and hands-on activities like automobile repair. German and French were added in 1949, with students beginning conversational French in first grade.

Coonley died in 1958; ACS had looked to Coonley for her leadership over the years but even more so for her philanthropy. ACS began charging tuition in 1929, but still relied on Coonley's financial support, and her death caused serious financial hardship. Under the direction of newly appointed headmaster John Malach, a summer program was launched in 1960, open to all children from the surrounding area, to increase revenues and visibility. A swimming pool was added in 1961 to bolster the program. Enrollment had declined over the years and Malach marketed the program aggressively, personally interviewing prospective students. In 1964 enrollment again reached 200 students, which brought in additional tuition and much needed financial stability.

In 1965, the benefits of the National College of Education partnership were less evident and the Administrative Board purchased Avery Coonley from the NCE. Under Malach's leadership, ACS continued to experiment and innovate. Despite widespread skepticism among contemporary educators that kindergartners were ready to read, ACS launched an early reading program in the early 1960s. Malach's stance was that "we don't believe a child should be taught because he or she is now 6 years old or in 1st grade. Our children begin to learn to read when the teacher determines the child is ready. Then the teacher works individually with the child at his or her own pace." By this time, however, the once-radical ideas of progressive education had become "conventional wisdom" and kindergarten was a ubiquitous feature of American public schools. As part of Malach's "bid to reforge the leadership role that Avery Coonley School had played during its early years", ACS joined the Independent Schools Association of the Central States (ISACS) in 1961. ISACS was founded in 1908 to promote best practices in independent schools, and instituted a mandatory accreditation program for member schools in 1961. Avery Coonley served as the headquarters of ISACS from 1970 until the central office was dissolved in 2000.

Malach also established the Institute for Educational Research (IER) in 1964 as a center for educational experimentation. The Institute, headquartered at ACS, was a joint venture with more than thirty public school districts, which collaborated on research projects and shared in the findings. The large number of schools involved ensured that statistically significant research samples were available and multiple projects could be pursued at one time. In one of the first projects of the Institute, 36 history teachers wrote over 2,000 test questions to help demonstrate that "many teachers want assistance in writing better evaluation items based on behavioral objectives". Examples of other projects include kindergarten speech programs, elementary science programs, and speed reading in junior high school.

Gifted education (1960s–present) 

The kindergarten reading program was the first step in the Avery Coonley School's transition to a new focus on the education of the gifted, which coincided with a growing public awareness of the needs of gifted children in the late 1960s. The increasing focus on gifted education was symbolized by the 1972 Marland Report to the United States Congress, which was the first acknowledgment of the characteristics of gifted children and their specific educational needs. The report found that "gifted children are, in fact, deprived and can suffer psychological damage and permanent impairment of their abilities to function well which is equal to or greater than the similar deprivation suffered by any other population with special needs". The report highlighted the necessity for educational services for the gifted, and the near total lack of such programs in the public schools at the time. Malach believed that the educational philosophy of Avery Coonley was well aligned with the most important objectives of a gifted program, namely, "the stimulation of individual interests ... the development of student initiative, the development of self-acceptance, concept development, and recognition of the early ability to undertake complex learning tasks."

In 1960, ACS began screening applicants for high intellectual potential, requiring a tested IQ above 120, achievement test results one and a half grade levels above national norms in reading and math, and intensive in-person evaluations. At the same time, the teachers began adapting the curriculum to meet the goals of a gifted program, allowing even more differentiation for each student, accommodating different learning styles, and incorporating enough flexibility for all students to progress at their own pace.

More accelerated classes were added, but the core of the gifted curriculum remained the individualized approaches and learning by doing that had long been central to the Avery Coonley curriculum. Nature study was still prominent in the student's activities, with music, art, and drama. The traditional learning themes and school projects involving maple trees, Native Americans, ancient Egypt and other topics were preserved but adapted to serve the gifted curriculum. In early 1980, an early childhood (EC) program for three-year-olds was launched, designed to cater to the needs of gifted preschool children and prepare them to transition from home to kindergarten. Again departing from the prevailing educational theory, Avery Coonley introduced academics in the EC program, with the same focus on nature, music, movement, and practical skills as the higher grades.

Campus

1929 building 

It borders the Maple Grove Forest Preserve, created in 1919, one of the oldest forest preserves in the Forest Preserve District of DuPage County system. The  preserve protects "the largest remaining remnant of the vast maple forest that became Downers Grove", and has been categorized a globally endangered ecosystem. Its black maple and upland sugar maple communities are host to many threatened and endangered plant species, and bloom with trillium, trout lilies, violets, buttercups, and wild geraniums in the spring. The forest is a refuge for a wide range of birds, including great horned owls and several species of hawks, as well as a stopover for several species of migratory birds, including the Indigo bunting, which nests there during the warm breeding season and migrates south by night in the winter. A  hiking trail winds through the preserve, crossing a small creek and passing a nearby pond. The preserve is used by students in their science and nature activities.

The designer of the grounds, Jens Jensen, was known as the "dean of the world's landscape architects", and "the father of the Chicago park system", for his creation of Humboldt Park, Garfield Park, the Cook County Forest Preserves, and his masterpiece, Columbus Park, in Chicago. Jensen's work became famous for his exclusive use of plants and materials native to the local region, and was characterized by his use of open spaces, flowing water, gently curving lines, and "council rings", or low circular benches where people can gather. All of these features are evident on the Avery Coonley campus, which makes use of wholly natural settings in lieu of formal gardens. The original landscaping was largely forgotten over the years and poorly maintained. A complete restoration of Jensen's landscape design was completed in 2006 as part of the ACS centennial celebration.

The building was designed by Coonley's son-in-law Waldron Faulkner, who, with his son (also an architect) Avery Coonley Faulkner, later became significant contributors to the design of George Washington University and American University in Washington, D.C. The design ties the building to the land in the style of the Prairie School, at the same time employing the handcrafted features and human scale typical of the American Arts and Crafts (or American Craftsman) style. The easy access to the outdoors, ground floor classrooms, separate science laboratories, and planned outdoor play area are among the features of the design that would later be adopted by schools throughout the US after World War II.

The building surrounds a courtyard with a large reflecting pool. The classrooms are oriented outward, to provide views of the surrounding forest. There are no interior passages in this part of the building; each class area has an exit to the outside, and students pass between rooms via the covered cloister, even in inclement weather. The design is meant to reinforce the "home and school" atmosphere that dates back to the Cottage School, with child-sized classrooms, ten working fireplaces, draperies, and other home-like details.

Decorative tiles designed by Henry Chapman Mercer—one of the leading figures of the Arts and Crafts Movement in the U.S.—are placed throughout the building. These tiles (known as Moravian tiles after Mercer's Moravian Pottery and Tile Works) feature deep colors and a handmade appearance that complement the simple brick buildings. The tiles on the fireplaces and entry floors boast patterns in literary and educational themes, such as The Canterbury Tales in the old library. A large, tripartite tile mural on the north wall of the courtyard, also by Mercer, depicts the eastern and western hemispheres united by a ship on an allegorical journey of education.

In 1970, exploring new designs in school furniture, the Institute for Educational Research worked with the Design Department of Southern Illinois University to create a series of interconnected truncated octahedrons known as "learning spaces", which resembled an oversized beehive. Each child had his or her own semi-private space with a fold-down seat, reading light, and bookshelf. The goal was to provide private spaces where third grade (eight-year-old) children could develop good study habits, and the school found that the children spent 90 percent of their work time in their learning spaces. The structures were featured in local news stories and in Life magazine. ACS patented the invention and sold models to several local schools. The original structures are still in use in the third grade classroom in 2014.

The Avery Coonley School was designated a historical site by the Downers Grove Historical Society in 2006, and was added to the National Register of Historic Places in 2007, which cited the educational program along with the building and grounds for their "unique design and features that have exerted a long-lasting influence on schools throughout the country".

Recent additions 

A new wing was added in early 1980 to provide additional space for the arts, with a large room for orchestra and music and another for studio art. Filling in the previously open east side of the courtyard, the design is nearly identical in design to the original school, built of red and white-washed brick with a cloister on the courtyard side. The Gatehouse, which was built in 1929 and had served as the headmaster's residence, was remodeled to house the early childhood program in 1988.

Increased enrollment in the late 1980s and the need for more space led to another addition in 1992. This addition included a new 17,500-volume library, a 16-station computer lab, and a 236-seat Performing Arts Center (PAC). Moravian tiles around the new foyer fireplace and library doors pay homage to the original building. The PAC "is known for its excellent acoustics", and hosts student productions and outside artistic groups, including the Beck Institute for the Arts, which stages musical recitals there.

Avery Coonley added a full-day kindergarten program in 2005, again requiring more space, and a $4 million,  middle school wing was constructed, financed through tax-exempt bonds from the Village of Downers Grove. Its cream and red bricks, hipped roof, deep eaves, and detailed brickwork harmonize with the style of the earlier building. The project added modernized math and science labs, two computer labs, and seven wireless classrooms using tablet computer technology, videoconferencing, and computer controlled overhead projectors. Over the 2022-2023 Winter Break, the basement was redone and transformed into offices, a student lounge, and a recharge room.

Curriculum 

The founding educational philosophy is still evident in the modern day curriculum in the focus on learning by doing, teaching based on broad themes that cross subjects, an emphasis on collaborative projects, and a de-emphasis of textbooks. There remains a close integration of art and nature in daily activities and a focus on the development of social skills and education for social responsibility. These principles, adapted in the 1970s for gifted students, have been further extended to accommodate new developments in technology and educational research.

ACS refers to grade levels as groups, a practice rooted in progressive education that dates back at least to the Junior Elementary School. There are three divisions of students: the early school, which includes the early childhood Program (EC) for three-year-olds and junior kindergarten (JK) for four-year-olds; the lower school for kindergarten through group four, and middle school for groups five through eight. Each class in kindergarten through group eight has 32 students. Each lower school class is team taught by two teachers. The student-to-teacher ratio in the lower and middle school is 16 to 1, 11 to 1 in kindergarten, 8 to 1 in junior kindergarten, and 7 to 1 in the early childhood program.

Academic program 

As of 2009, the curriculum is accelerated for each group, which is separated by grade and age; students are instructed a minimum of one year above their current grade level. (For example, the first group is taught at a second grade level.) Students are grouped within their class to allow each of them work at the level of their ability, and they may work several years beyond their current level if they can do so. Students may join older groups to study subjects, which they are exceptionally advanced; however, age groups are usually kept together "for social and emotional values". All middle school students complete a high school level honors course in mathematics in either algebra or geometry.

Students explore broad learning themes at each level that allow them to learn across subjects and engage them in creative and collaborative projects. The second group, for example, spends much of their year on the study of trees, using trees as a focus for biology, mathematics, art, and creative writing. Students adopt and study a personal space in the nearby forest preserve. The year culminates with the tapping of maple trees to make syrup, which they share with the rest of the school. Each group engages different themes and group projects. Lower school students simulate an airplane flight to Paris and host a Japanese luncheon. The fourth group holds a Native American Fair, the fifth group creates an original Egyptian style mastaba, the sixth group presents a World's Fair, and the eighth group organizes an Immigration and Ethnic Fair.

Science studies are enhanced by nature and outdoor experiences. Students participate in nature programs sponsored by the Forest Preserve District of DuPage County and the Illinois Department of Natural Resources, such as adopting a "Bass in the Class", and monitoring the growth of macroinvertebrates in the DuPage River. Competition in regional and state science fairs and Science Olympiad is considered an integral part of the science program. All students are strongly encouraged to participate, and the seventh group students are required to do so.

All students study French, which is taught by language immersion, a technique in which they only speak French during language study. All signs in the building are written in both French and English. Students begin French instruction in junior kindergarten, and continue on to study French four times a week in groups one through eight. They culminate their study with a week-long experience in Quebec in group eight, during which they only speak French.

Visual art study begins with drawing and painting and then advances to more complex techniques such as sculpture, stained glass, architecture, photography, and pottery. Students learn in a variety of media, including watercolor, oil pastels, charcoal, and clay. Music study begins in the early childhood program. As they progress, Avery Coonley students participate in vocal music, playing Orff instruments and recorders, dancing, and public performance. In middle school, students develop music literacy by reading and writing music, playing choir chimes, and choral singing. The study of music in culture and the history of jazz and opera are taught alongside theory and performance.

The drama program begins in acting and dramatic writing, directing, and the technical arts in the fourth group. Students practice both rehearsed and improvised performances to create pantomimes, monologues, films, and short plays. Their theatrical work culminates in the eighth group with the performance of one-act plays the students write and direct themselves and the production of a professionally scripted full-length play. Artistically inclined students can extend their arts studies outside of class in optional activities including Art Club, Chorus, Orchestra, Tech Club, Drama Club, and the Variety Show.

Technology 

Avery Coonley began using computers for instruction in 1971 and offering computer programming to students as young as the fourth group in 1976. Desktop computers were brought into the classrooms to teach math, language arts, music, art, and computer programming, in 1978. Students begin learning basic keyboard and mouse skills in kindergarten and progress to multimedia presentations, data management, and software coding in the eighth group.

In what ACS calls "one-to-one computing", every student in the fifth group through the eighth group receives a tablet computer, which they use to manage their daily schedules, work on class assignments, and prepare special projects. Students in early childhood and junior kindergarten have shared tablets available, and each kindergarten through the fourth group class has at least four. Students study in classrooms equipped with wireless overhead projectors, manipulate programs and presentations on touchscreen-equipped SMART board systems, and engage in self-paced classroom learning using ActiveExpression wireless response systems. Students, teachers, and parents communicate and interact online via a school-wide intranet and an extranet for parents. Sixteen dual platform iMacs were added in 2009 for computer lab work.

Traditions 

A hallmark of the curriculum in the earliest days was study organized around major themes—trees, Shakespeare, Egypt and other subjects—that built over the school year into major class projects, performances, and all-school gatherings. Many of these themes and events have grown into lasting school traditions, with which the school community has come to identify each group and certain times of year. One of the school's most cherished traditions, tapping maple trees to make syrup, began with the move to the new building in 1929. The Spring Fair, in which groups one through five each prepare and perform their own dance, has been held annually since the 1930s—the Maypole dance by the fifth group dates back to the beginning of the Cottage School.

The annual third group overnight nature trip to Wisconsin, dates back to 1974, and the eighth group French immersion trip began in the 1970s with trips to Paris and since the mid-1990s to Quebec. Other lower school traditions, such as the Native American Fair and class visit to the Coonley Estate, also have a long history at Avery Coonley. Middle school traditions include the alternating annual Greek and Shakespeare Fests, the sixth group World's Fair, and a seventh group trip to Washington, D.C.

In the annual Thanksgiving Program, the students, in identical brown capes, silently construct a large cornucopia of fruits and vegetables in a ceremony choreographed to music prepared by each class. The food is later donated to The Salvation Army. It is the most treasured of the school traditions, and has been performed every year, virtually unchanged, since 1929.

Extracurricular activities 

Many of the extracurricular activities offered at ACS offer an extension of classroom subjects and an opportunity for students to pursue those studies in additional depth. Within the arts program, chorus, creative writing, drama, art, and three levels of orchestra are offered as optional activities. Students in these groups have opportunities to perform and exhibit their work throughout the year. The Book Club is available to students in groups six and above to extend the reading program. Computer Club, Creative Writing Club, Art Club, French Film Club, and Drama Club also offer opportunities to build on classroom activities.

Student Council is primarily a service organization, which organizes charitable fund raising and community service opportunities in which all students can participate. Two representatives are elected from each group, one through eight, for each school year. Students may also volunteer for the Annual staff, which edits and produces the yearbook, Reflections.

Intramural sports are offered to students in group five and interscholastic sports are available in groups five through eight. ACS competes in the West DuPage Elementary School Association (WDESA) Conference. Team sports include co-ed soccer and girls' volleyball in the fall, boys' and girls' basketball in the winter, and co-ed track in the spring. There are no team tryouts and all students are free to participate.

ACS students participate actively in academic competitions at the state and national level, including Mathcounts, Science Olympiad, and other math and science competitions, as well spelling bees, geography bees, and contests in other subjects. The Chess Club competes locally, and won the first-place trophy in the Naperville Chess Tournament in 2009.

Student body and finances 

Admission is competitive and decisions are based on evaluations of applicants' intellectual ability, social and emotional maturity, and readiness for the accelerated program of study. Applicants for kindergarten through eighth group must submit IQ test results at or above the 95th percentile (at or above 124 on the Wechsler Preschool and Primary Scale of Intelligence (WPPSI) or Wechsler Intelligence Scale for Children (WISC)), with consistent subtest scores, to qualify for consideration. Evaluations are based on report cards, parent questionnaires, teacher recommendations, and in-person assessments by the faculty. Early childhood through kindergarten applicants are screened in one-hour play sessions. Applicants for groups one and two are invited for a half-day school visit, and older applicants for an entire day, where they are assessed by teachers in the actual classroom setting.

Avery Coonley serves 338 students aged 3 through 14 as of 2023, with a nearly even ratio of males to females in each grade. ACS seeks to achieve ethnic diversity in every group, and offers limited need-based aid to families of children who would otherwise be unable to attend. The student body is "primarily middle- and upper-class white suburban children", and students "come from some of the most affluent families" in Chicago's western suburbs, but thirty percent of the students are non-white.

Tuition for kindergarten through group eight was $23,950, junior kindergarten was $11,700, and early childhood $6,200 in 2018. The Annual Giving Fund makes up 3.5 percent and the Annual Auction another 5 percent of the operating budget ($5.9 million in 2008–2009).

Academic achievement 

"Avery Coonley reports that scores on the Iowa Test of Basic Skills, an exam given in schools across the United States, are in the top 1 percent in the nation", with average scores of 99 in all eight grades and all four test sections (vocabulary, comprehension, language arts, and mathematics). Avery Coonley was one of seventeen Illinois schools recognized as a Blue Ribbon School by the United States Department of Education in 1987–88 for "excellence in student success, school philosophy, curriculum, leadership, and climate". Over five percent of Avery Coonley graduates since 1989 have been admitted to the nationally recognized Illinois Mathematics and Science Academy (IMSA), Illinois' public, competitive-entry, boarding school for top math and science students.

Avery Coonley students have a record of top honors at the state and national level in science, math, geography and other subjects stretching back as far as 1989. In recent competitions, students won 24 Gold Medals at the 2009 Illinois Junior Academy of Science (IJAS) Science Fair, and won the Science Olympiad Jr. High State Championship. Avery Coonley won the 2009 IMSA Junior High Mathematics Competition (with four out of five first place awards) and placed second in the 2009 Illinois State MATHCOUNTS competition. In 2008, a seventh group student placed in the top 0.2 percent of competitors from around the world with a perfect score in the 24th annual American Mathematics Contest.

In 2009, the seventh and eighth group Social Studies teams both placed third in the nation at the National Social Studies League contest and an ACS student won the Illinois Geography Bee, The same year, two eighth group students received perfect scores on Le Grand Concours—the National French Contest of the American Association of Teachers of French. Of the 40 Avery Coonley students who took Le Grand Concours, 32 placed in the top ten in the nation at their grade level. Avery Coonley third group students "won highest honors in the WordMasters Challenge, a national language arts competition" in 2007, placing eighth in the nation out of more than 200 teams.

Controversy erupted in 1994, when ACS won the Illinois State Science Fair team competition for the fourth year in a row, prompting the IJAS "to banish the school from team competition for [the] next year, on the grounds that their students were 'just too good. The incident attracted national attention and was decried as an example of the "dumbing down" of education and the victory of self-esteem over excellence in schools. The IJAS relented under pressure from the media, but eliminated the team competition altogether in future years. Avery Coonley students won 24 top individual awards the following year.

Notes

References

Works cited 

 
 
 
 .

External links 

 

Private elementary schools in Illinois
National Register of Historic Places in DuPage County, Illinois
Private middle schools in Illinois
Educational institutions established in 1906
Gifted education
Downers Grove, Illinois
School buildings completed in 1929
Schools in DuPage County, Illinois
1906 establishments in Illinois
School buildings on the National Register of Historic Places in Illinois
Private K–8 schools in the United States